Korash may refer to:
 Korash, Iran
 Kurash
 Korash, a pagan deity mentioned in the Book of Abraham